was Japanese politician of the Liberal Democratic Party (LDP) who served as minister for foreign affairs and minister of health and welfare. He was called "flying foreign minister" due to his active diplomacy in increasing the role of Japan when he was in office. He was one of the significant figures in normalizing the relations between Japan and China.

Early life
Sonoda was born in Kumamoto Prefecture on 11 December 1913.

Career
Sonoda joined the Japanese army in 1938, and served both in China and in the Pacific area during World War II. He was commander of a kamikaze squad during the war. In 1947, Sonoda was elected to the House of Representatives, the lower house of the Diet, representing the Kumamoto Prefecture. He was previously a member of the Democratic Party. Then he became a member of the LDP when the Democratic Party joined the Liberals.

In the 1950s, he was the special envoy of the LDP. He served as parliamentary vice-foreign minister in 1955, and actively involved in normalizing the relations between Japan and the USSR. However, in 1960, he resigned from the LDP due to his objections to the ratification of the US-Japan mutual security treaty.

After rejoining the LDP, Sonoda also served as vice speaker of the lower house for two terms: from 20 December 1965 to 27 December 1966 and from 15 February 1967 to 25 November 1967. He served as minister of health and welfare from 1967 to 1968, which he held again from 1980 to 1981.

In addition, Sonoda was chief cabinet secretary in the cabinet led by Takeo Fukuda from 24 December 1976 to 28 November 1977.

Within the LDP Sonoda was against the Nakasone faction and formed his own. He and the members of his faction joined the faction headed by Fukuda in 1972. However, he later left it and joined the faction headed by Masayoshi Ōhira.

Minister of foreign affairs
Sonoda served as minister of foreign affairs three times: in the cabinet of Prime Minister Takeo Fukuda from November 1977 to December 1978, in the cabinet of Prime Minister Masayoshi Ohira from December 1978 to November 1979, and in the cabinet of Prime Minister Zenko Suzuki from 17 May to 30 November 1981.

During his first term in the ministry of foreign affairs, Japan signed the treaty of peace and friendship with China. This treaty formed the basis of the relationships between two countries. Sonoda represented his country at the signature of this treaty in Beijing in 1978. He was secondly appointed foreign minister to the cabinet of Masayoshi Ohira who kept this and other three ministries for his own faction. When in office for the second time, Sonoda visited five African countries in July 1979, including Tanzania, Nigeria, Kenya, Ivory Coast and Senegal. He also traveled South America in August 1979.

On 17 May 1981, Sonoda was appointed by Prime Minister and his close friend Zenko Suzuki as foreign minister for the last time due to unexpected resignation of the former Foreign Minister Masayoshi Ito. Sonoda called for adopting the omnidirectional diplomacy and unlike his two predecessors, issued entry visas to Soviet economic delegations. He was replaced by Yoshio Sakurauchi in the post 30 November 1981. The reason for Sonoda's removal from his post was his blunt remarks concerning U.S. policies in June 1981 as well as his other statements detrimental to Japan's relations with South Korea.

Personal life
Sunao Sonoda married twice. His son from the first marriage, Hiroyuki Sonoda, ran for his father seat in the Kumamoto Prefecture in the general elections of 1986. Sonoda'a second wife, Tenkoko Sonoda, also tried to take over her husband's seat in the same election following his death. She was a member of the Diet during her marriage to Sunao. They married after World War II and had two children.

Death
Sonoda died of kidney failure at the hospital of Keio University in Tokyo on 2 April 1984.

Honours

National honour
Grand Cordon of the Order of the Rising Sun (2 April 1984; posthumous)

Foreign honour
 Bolivia: Grand Cross of the Order of the Condor of the Andes (6 July 1978)
 Chile  : Grand Cross of the Order of the Bernardo O'Higgins (21 August 1979)

References

External links

|-

|-

|-

|-

|-

|-

|-

20th-century Japanese politicians
1913 births
1984 deaths
Deaths from kidney failure
Foreign ministers of Japan
Imperial Japanese Army officers
Imperial Japanese Army personnel of World War II
Kamikaze pilots
Liberal Democratic Party (Japan) politicians
Members of the House of Representatives (Japan)
People from Kumamoto Prefecture
Politicians from Kumamoto Prefecture
Sunao
Spouses of Japanese politicians